Margaret Crowley (born March 17, 1986 in Saint Paul, Minnesota) is an Olympic speed skater from the United States, who competed in 3000 m and the team pursuit at the 2006 Winter Olympics.

Margaret ("Maggie") Crowley grew up in the Chicago area and attended Northwestern University for college.

After the Olympics, Crowley worked in New York City before attending Harvard Business School (Class of 2014).

Now that she's no longer training for the Olympics, Maggie's found a favorite new exercise in the form of Muay Thai and is an avid lover of guacamole.

She currently works as a product manager at Drift.

Employment
For two years, Maggie was a product manager at TripAdvisor.

References
 U.S. Speedskating profile
 NBC Olympics profile

External links
 

1986 births
Living people
American female speed skaters
Speed skaters at the 2006 Winter Olympics
Olympic speed skaters of the United States
Harvard Business School alumni
Northwestern University alumni
21st-century American women